The men's speed skating 500 metres competition in roller sports at the 2015 Pan American Games was held on July 13 at the St. John Paul II Catholic Secondary School in Toronto.

Schedule
All times are Central Standard Time (UTC-6).

Results
12 athletes from 12 countries competed.

Semifinal - Heat 1

Semifinal - Heat 2

Final

References

Roller sports at the 2015 Pan American Games